Agreiter is a germanised version of the Ladin surname Aiarëi. Notable people with the surname include:

 Debora Agreiter (born 1991), Italian cross-country skier
 Anton Agreiter (1934–2003), Roman Catholic priest 

Surnames of Italian origin
Rhaeto-Romance surnames